Koninklijke Patro Eisden Maasmechelen is a Belgian football club from the municipality of Maasmechelen in Limburg.

The original club name was V.V. Patro Eisden until 1992 when they changed to K. Patro Eisden.  In 1998, it changed to K. Maasland Maasmechelen trying to gather supporters from the whole Maasland region. In 2001 they adopted the current name after they signed a deal with Roda JC.

The club finished 17th in the 2004–05 second division season but was relegated as they did not receive the professional football license. It was suggested that they should play in the promotion (and even in provincial leagues) as they were both sportively (17th) and financially (no license) relegated but the Belgian Football Association finally decided they must play in the third division for the 2005–06 season. The FA changed the decision eventually. Following this, the club changed its name again to K. Patro Eisden Maasmechelen starting on the 2005–06 season in the fourth division.

Current squad

References

External links
Official website

 
Association football clubs established in 1942
Football clubs in Belgium
1942 establishments in Belgium
Belgian Pro League clubs